Anarchias euryurus is a moray eel found in the eastern Atlantic Ocean. It was first named by Lea in 1913.

References

euryurus
Fish of the Atlantic Ocean
Fish described in 1913